PTC Punjabi Music Awards are presented annually by PTC Punjabi to honour both artistic and technical excellence of professionals in the Punjabi language music industry of India.

2014 winners 

Best Sound Recording

Sameer – Putt Saadey

Best Religious Album (Traditional)

Satgur Daya Karo – Bhai Onkar Singh

GuruBest Religious Album (Non Traditional)

Guru Ki Kaashi – Devenderpal Singh – Shemaroo

Best Music Video of a Religious Song (Traditional) 

Prem Khaelan Ka Chao – Bhai Nirmal Singh Ji – Shemaroo

Best Music Video of a Religious Song (Non Traditional)

Sardaar Ji – Satinder Sartaaj

Best Music Video Director

DirectorGifty – Proper Patola

Best Music Video

Soch - Hardy Sandhu

Best Debut Vocalist (Female)

Kaur B – Miss U

Best Debut Vocalist (Male)

Guru Randhawa - Dardan Nu

Best Lyricist

Satinder Sartaaj

Best Music Director for a Single

Yo Yo Honey Singh – Bebo

Best Music Director for an Album

Jatinder Shah – Afsaney Sartaj De

Best Punjabi based Song in a Hindi Film

Ambarsariya – Fukrey

Best Non Resident Punjabi Music Director

Pav Dharia – Red

Best Non Resident Punjabi Vocalist

Jazzy B – Feem

Best Duet Vocalists

Navraj Hans/Gurmit Singh – Saiyaan

Best Folk Oriented Song

Jatt Di Akal – Ranjit Bawa

Best Folk Pop Album

The Gambler – Preet Harpal

Best Folk Pop Vocalist

Roshan Prince – Dist Sangrur

Best Album of the Year

Jattizm – Ammy Virk

Best Pop Vocalist (Female)

Bathinda Beats – Miss Pooja

Best Pop Vocalist (Male)

Diljit Dosanjh

Most Popular Song of the Year

Proper Patola – Diljit Dosanjh

Best Club Song of the Year

Bebo Alfaaz/Yo Yo Honey Singh

Most Romantic Ballad of the Year

Soch – Hardy Sandhu

Best Bhangra Song of the Year

Mr Pendu – Roshan Prince

Virse De Waris Award

Padamshree Vikramjeet Singh Sahni

Entertainer of the Year

Gippy Grewal

Sufi Sikander Award

Satinder Sartaj

2015 winners 

Best Album of the Year

Judaa 2 by Amrinder Gill

Best Sound Recording

Phatte Chuk Di by PBN

Best Bhangra Song of the Year

Patiala Peg by Diljit Dosanjh

Most Popular Song of the Year

Mitran De Boot by Jazzy B and Kaur B

Best Pop Male Vocalist for a Single

Diljit Dosanjh for ‘Patiala Peg’

Best Pop Male Vocalist for an Album

Amrinder Gill for ‘Judaa 2’

Best Pop Female Vocalist

Miss Pooja for Painkiller

Best Debut Male Vocalist

Arsh Benipal for Goli and Jay Malhi for Kasoor’

Best Debut Female Vocalist

Satvir Sidhu for Stunning Jatti

Best Duet Vocalists

Jazzy B and Kaur B for Mitran De Boot

Best Religious Album (Traditional)

‘Meri Patian’ by Bhai Jaskaran Singh

Best Religious Album (Non Traditional)

Gurmukh Pyareo by Geeta Zaildar

Best Folk Pop Album

Ranjhanna by Lakhwinder Wadali

Best Folk Oriented Song

Jatti by Harjit Harman

Best Folk Pop Vocalist

Roshan Prince for Back to Bhangra

Best Non-Resident Punjabi Album

Collaborations 3 by Sukshinder Shinda

Best Non-Resident Punjabi Vocalist

Jazzy B for Singhan Diyan Gadiyan

Best Club Song of the Year

Black Suit by Preet Harpal

Best Song with a Social Message

Nashe by Preet Harpal

Most Romantic Ballad of the Year

IK Saal by Jassi Gill

Best Punjabi Based Song in a Hindi Film

‘Pataka Guddi’ by Jyoti and Sultana, taken from Highway (2014)

Best Music Video

‘Diary’ by Amrinder Gill

Best Music Video Director

Rimpy Prince for ‘Black Suit’ and Virsa Arts for ‘Joker’

Best Music Director for a Single

Desi Routz for ‘Haar Jaani Aa’

Best Music Director for an Album

Atul Sharma for ‘Folk Collaboration’ and B Praak

Best Music Video of a Religious Song (Traditional)

‘Sach Sahib Mera’ by Biba Arvind Pal Kaur

Best Music Video of a Religious Song (Non Traditional) 

‘Shukar Dateya’ by Prabh Gill

Best Non-Resident Punjabi Music Director

Dr Zeus for ‘Judaa 2’

Best Comedy Album

‘Lehri Sahib’ by Sudesh Lehri and Bharti Singh

Best Lyricist

Happy Raikoti for ‘Diary’

Lifetime Achievement Award

Ustad Puran Chand Pyare Lal Wadali

Wirse Da Waaris Award

Baba Kashinath

Suran de Shehanshah Award

Atul Sharma

PTC Rockstar 2015 Award

Yo Yo Honey Singh

2016 winners 

Best Bhangra Song of the Year

"Panj Taara" by Diljit Dosanjh

Most Popular Song of the Year

"Panj Taara" by Diljit Dosanjh

Best Pop Male Vocalist for a Single

Roshan Prince for "Dil Darda"

Best Pop Male Vocalist for an Album

Nachhatar Gill

Best Pop Female Vocalist

Miss Pooja for "Date on Ford"

Kaur B for "Phulkari"

Best New Male Artist

Jordan Sandhu

Best New Female Artist

Jenny Johal, Sufi Sparrows

Best Duet Vocalist

Prabh Gill and Sudesh Kumari for "Desi Pyaar"

Best Duo/Group

Navv Inder and Badshah for "Wakhra Swag’" Guru and Bohemia for "Patola"

Best Religious Album (Traditional)

"Koi Aan Milave" by Bhai Rhai Singh

Best Religious Album (Non Traditional)

"Roar Of The Singh" by Gyani Gurpreet Singh

Best Folk Pop Album

"Mitti Da Bawa" by Ranjit Bawa

Best Folk Pop Vocalist

Lakhwinder Wadali for "Laggian Zora Zori"

Best New Age Vocalist

Mankirt Aulakh for "Gallon Mithiyaan" 

Ninja for "Thokda Reha"

Best Sufi Album

"Hamza" by Satinder Sartaaj

Best Non-Resident Punjabi Vocalist

Jazzy B for "Repeat"

Best Club Song of the Year

"All Black" by Sukh-E Muzical Doctorz

Best Song with a Message

"Thokar" by Hardeep Grewal

Most Romantic Ballad of the Year

"Bas Tu" by Roshan Prince

"Mere Kol" by Prabh Gill

Best Punjabi Based Song in a Hindi Film

"Chittiyan Kalaiyan" taken from Roy (2015)

Best Music Video

"Dil Darda" by Roshan Prince

Best Music Video Director

Frame Singh for "Time Table 2"

Pramod Rana Sharma for "Hamza"

Best Music Director for a Single

Badshah for ‘Wakhra Swag’

Sukh-E Muzical Doctorz 

Raftaar for "All Black"

Best Music Director for an Album

Gurmit Singh

Best Music Video of a Religious Song (Traditional)

"Mangna Mangan Neeka" by Dr. Gurnam Singh Ji

Best Music Video of a Religious Song (Non Traditional)

‘Sift’ by Satinder Sartaaj

Best Non-Resident Punjabi Music Director

Dr Zeus for ‘Inch’

Best Lyricist

"Pardes" by Pargat Rihan

‘Zindabad Yaarian’ by Maninder Turke

Lifetime Achievement Award

Gurmeet Bawa

Rising Star Award

Gagan Kokri

Golden Star Award

Malkeet Singh

2017 winners 
BEST RELIGIOUS ALBUM

Bhai Simranjeet Singh ji / Bhai Gurdeep Singh Ji – Apni Mehar Kar

Bhai Gagandeep Singh Ji – Om Namoh

BEST NEW ARTIST (FEMALE)

Sunanda Sharma – Patake

BEST MUSIC VIDEO DIRECTOR 

Parmish Verma – Khaab

Frame Singh – Antenna

BEST LYRICIST

Vijay Dhammi – Tere Na Di Mehndi

Jaani – Ikk Vaari Hor Soch Le

Best Music Director For An Album 

Hajare wala Munda – Jatinder Shah

Best Music Video

Parmish Verma – Meri Sardarniye

Best Music Director for Single 

Goldboy – Oh Kyu Ni Jaan ske

Best Non Resident Music Director

Pav Dharia – Heer

Best Punjabi Song in Hindi Movie 

High Heel – Jaz Dhami

Punjabi Legacy Award

Sachin Ahuja

Rising Star

Harish Verma

BEST NEW ARTIST (MALE)

Monty & Waris – Mehfil Yaaran Di

Rajvir Jawanda – Surname

BEST DUET VOCALISTS 

Gippy Grewal / Neha Kakkar – Patt Lainge

BEST DUO/GROUP

Jazzy B / Amrit Maan / Kaur B – Shikaar

Roshan Prince / Milind Gaba – Jatti De Nain

BEST FOLK POP VOCALIST 

Bai Amarjit – 5 Crore

BEST SONG WITH A MESSAGE 

Geetkariyan – Gurshabad / Satta Vairowalia

Maade Time – Amar Sandhu

BEST CLUB SONG OF THE YEAR 

Half Window Down – Ikka

Suit – Guru / Arjun

BEST BHANGRA SONG OF THE YEAR

3 Peg – Sharry Mann

MOST ROMANTIC BALLAD OF THE YEAR 

Khaab – Akhil

Oh Kyu Ni Jaan Ske – Ninja

BEST NEW AGE VOCALIST 

Akhil – Teri Kami

Babbal Rai – Na Kar Gayee

Ninja – Oh Kyu Ni Jaan Ske

Fankaar E Sufi Award 

Kanwar Grewal

BEST POP VOCALIST (MALE) FOR A SINGLE

Jassie Gill – Gabroo

Kulwinder Billa – Antenna

Ranjit Bawa – Ja Ve Mundeya

Best Pop Album Of The Year 

Desi Rock Star 2 – Gippy Grewal

BEST POP VOCALIST (FEMALE) FOR A SINGLE

Miss Pooja – Dimaag Khraab

MOST POPULAR SONG OF THE YEAR 

3 Peg – Sharry Mann

Laembadgini -Diljit Dosanjh

Hornn Blow – Hardy Sandhu

2018 winners 
Life Time Achievement 

Hans Raj Hans

Sangeet Sartaj Award 

Dr. Satinder Sartaj

Fakr Punjab Da Award 

Irshad Kamil

Most Creative Award 

Satinder Satti

Best Religious Album (Non-Traditional) 

Zalam by Budnamwal waliyan Bibiyan

Best Religious Album (Traditional) 

Dhubida door kro Bhai Satinderbir Singh JI and Jis Nu Teri Nadar by Bhai Onkar Singh Ji.

Best Music Video Director  

Arvindr Khaira for Masstaani

Winner of Best Debut (Male)  

Rohanpreet Singh for Taqleef

Best Debut (Female) 

Tanishq Kaur for Meri Jaan

Best Music Video

Tarsem Jassar for Turbanator

Best Music Director For A Single 

B Praak for Naah

Best Lyricist  

Satinder  Sartaaj for Masoomiyat.

Best Music Video Of Religious Song (Non- Traditional)  

Manpreet Sandhu for  Kaum Hai Sheraan Di

Best Non Resident Punjabi Vocalist Award  

Sukhshinder Shinda

Best Non-Resident Punjabi Music Director  

Official VEE Music – for Lahore

Best Punjabi Song in Hindi Movie 

High Rated Gabru from Movie Nawaabzade

Best Jury Choice awards 

Kanwar Grewal for Mayanagri

Best Sufi song of the year 

Lakhwinder Wadali for Rangi Gayi

Best Song with a message 

Hardeep Grewal for Bulandiyan

Best Folk Pop Vocalist (Male) 

  Roshan Prince for Pekeyan Nu

Best Folk Pop Vocalist (Female) 

Anmol Gagan Mannfor  Wala Wali Pagg

Best Folk Oriented Song 

Kaur B for Boliyan

Best Duet Vocalists (Male) 

Kulwinder Billa & Shivjot for  Palazzo

Best Duet Vocalists (Female) 

Sajjan Adeeb & Shipra Goyal for Naraan

Most Romantic Song of  the Year 

Prabh Gill for Tareyaan De Des

Best Bhangra Song of the Year  

Ranjit Bawa for Heavy Weight Bhangra

Best Sad Song Of the year 

Roi Na – Ninja

Best Club Song of the year 

Dr. Zeus & Zora Randhawa for Woofer

References 

Indian music awards
Indian awards
Indian music
Punjab, India awards
Year of establishment missing